Acidaminococcus is a genus in the phylum Bacillota (Bacteria), whose members are anaerobic diplococci that can use amino acids as the sole energy source for growth. Like other members of the class Negativicutes, they are gram-negative, despite being Bacillota, which are normally gram-positive.

Etymology
The name Acidaminococcus derives from:New Latin noun acidum (from Latin adjective acidus, sour), an acid; New Latin adjective aminus, amino; New Latin masculine gender noun coccus (from Greek masculine gender noun kokkos (κόκκος), grain, seed), coccus-shaped; New Latin masculine gender noun Acidaminococcus, the amino acid coccus.

Phylogeny
The currently accepted taxonomy is based on the List of Prokaryotic names with Standing in Nomenclature (LPSN) and National Center for Biotechnology Information (NCBI)

See also
 Bacterial taxonomy
 Microbiology
 Selenomonas
 List of bacterial orders
 List of bacteria genera

References 

Bacteria genera
Acidaminococcaceae
Gram-negative bacteria